Mount Ronayne is a  summit located in the Pemberton Valley of British Columbia, Canada.

Description

Precipitation runoff and glacial meltwater from the mountain's north slope drains into Tenas Creek, the east slope drains to Fowl Creek, and the south slope drains to Owl Creek, all of which are tributaries of the Birkenhead River.

Etymology
The mountain is named after John Ronayne, an Irish veteran of the Klondike Gold Rush who settled in the Pemberton Meadows area in 1906. The name was proposed by Walter Girling to honor the judge and his family who were among the early settlers in Pemberton Valley and were instrumental in advancing the interests of the Pemberton area. The mountain's toponym was officially adopted November 5, 1946, by the Geographical Names Board of Canada. John Ronayne is credited with the 1931 first ascent of nearby Sun God Mountain, and the 1935 first ascent  of Mount Sampson which is further up the Pemberton Valley.

Climate
Based on the Köppen climate classification, Mount Ronayne is located in a subarctic climate zone of western North America. Most weather fronts originate in the Pacific Ocean, and travel east toward the Coast Mountains where they are forced upward by the range (Orographic lift), causing them to drop their moisture in the form of rain or snowfall. As a result, the Coast Mountains experience high precipitation, especially during the winter months in the form of snowfall. Winter temperatures can drop below −20 °C with wind chill factors below −30 °C. This climate supports small glacier remnants on the north slope. The months July through September offer the most favorable weather for climbing Mount Ronayne.

See also
 
 Geography of British Columbia

References

External links

 John Ronayne (photo): Pembertonmuseum.org
 Weather: Mount Ronayne
 Hiking Mount Ronayne: besthikesbc.ca

Two-thousanders of British Columbia
Pacific Ranges
Lillooet Land District
Coast Mountains
Pemberton Valley
Lillooet Country